Randolph Lycett and Elizabeth Ryan were the defending champions, but lost in the semi-finals to eventual champions Brian Gilbert and Kitty McKane.

Gilbert and McKane defeated Leslie Godfree and Dorothy Shepherd-Barron in the final, 6–3, 3–6, 6–3 to win the mixed doubles tennis title at the 1924 Wimbledon Championships.

Draw

Finals

Top half

Section 1

Section 2

Bottom half

Section 3

Section 4

The nationality of BL Cameron is unknown.

References

External links

X=Mixed Doubles
Wimbledon Championship by year – Mixed doubles